The D.W.L. SG-21 Lwów  was a Polish high performance sailplane built for the Polish government. Though both it and a development, the SG-28, were one-offs, they set several national records and led to the batch-produced Warsztaty Szybowcowe SG-3.

Design and development

Along with the Czerwiński CW 5 bis the Lwów was he result of a Ministry of Transport call for a high performance competition sailplane. It was designed by Szczepan Grzesczyk and its construction by DWL at Okęcie began in July 1931. The Lwów made its first flight, piloted by Grzesczyk, on 16 October 1931, well before its rival.

It was an all-wood, single-seat, high wing aircraft. Its wing was in two parts, rectangular in span inboard but trapezoidal over most of the span. Each part was built around a single spar with plywood covering from it forwards around the leading edge forming a torsion-resistant D-box. Behind the spar the wings were fabric-covered. They were connected together centrally on a streamlined fuselage pylon. The ailerons, also fabric-covered, operated differentially.

The Lwów's fuselage was a semi-monococque ply shell of oval cross-section with its open cockpit was ahead of the wing-pylon. Aft of the pylon the fuselage became slimmer back to a tall, ply-covered fin, integral with the fuselage and carrying broad, mostly fabric-covered balanced rudder. There was no tailplane as the narrow, tapered elevator was of the all-flying type. It was mounted on top of the fuselage and forward of the rudder.

Landing gear was a rubber-sprung skid and small tailskid.

The fuselage was cleaned up, the cockpit provided with a detachable enclosure, initially ply-framed then a tubular structure with windows, and pneumatic shock-absorbers replaced the rubber springs of the landing skid. As a result of these changes the SG-28 had an improved glide ratio (22.5) and lower sink rate ).

Operational history

Grzeszczyk piloted the glider behind a RWD 4 flown by Drezwwiecki. On 19 October Grzeszczyk set a new Polish national endurance record of 7 h 52 m 45 s.

The SG-21 also took part in the February 1933 First Course of Towing Flights.

The SG-28 was flight tested in the summer of 1932. Its outstanding flight was made the following year when on 21 June Bolesław Baranowski set two national records on one flight which lasted for 10 h 40 m and reached , though this altitude was surpassed by Offierski's later flight.

The two gliders flew on into the mid-1930s. Though only one of each type was built, they provided Grzeszczyk with experience that was incorporated into the design of the batch-built Warsztaty Szybowcowe SG-3  which became Poland's most popular and successful high performance sailplane in the mid-1930s.

Variants
SG-21 Lwów One only, as described

SG-28 Revised design with new, longer span wing of varying section and aerodynamically cleaned-up fuselage with enclosed cockpit. One only.

Specifications (SG-21)

References

External links
 samolotypolskie.pl
 j2mcl-planeurs.net

Aircraft first flown in 1931
1930s Polish sailplanes
High-wing aircraft